Henchmen is a 2018 Canadian computer-animated action comedy film directed by Adam Wood and co-written by Wood, Jay D. Waxman, David Ray, and Bobby Henwood, based on Wood's own 2014 short film Henchmen: Ill Suited. The film stars Thomas Middleditch as a henchman-in-training,  James Marsden as his mentor, Rosario Dawson as a scientist, and Alfred Molina as the super villain. Production began in May 2015 in British Columbia.

Produced by Bron Studios, the film was originally planned to be released in 2016, but ultimately received a limited release in Canada on December 7, 2018, by Entertainment One. In the United States, it was released on digital platforms on October 9, 2020, by Vertical Entertainment.

Premise
A fallen henchman named Hank leads a team of Lester and two others, called the "Union of Evil", who must prevent Baron Blackout from dominating the world. The crew are assigned to the Vault of Villainy, where Lester accidentally steals the ultimate weapon.

Cast

 Thomas Middleditch as Lester
 James Marsden as Hank 
 Rosario Dawson as Jolene
 Alfred Molina as Baron Blackout 
 Will Sasso as The Gluttonator and Union Boss
 Nathan Fillion as Captain Superior
 Rob Riggle as Biff
 Jane Krakowski as Jane
 Craig Robinson as Stew
 Bobcat Goldthwait as Jackalope

Production
The project was first announced on August 13, 2014, when Adam Wood's short film Henchmen: Ill Suited was released, with Gary Sanchez Productions (owned by Adam McKay, Will Ferrell and Chris Henchy) attached to executive produce the film for Bron Studios. Wood would direct the film, which he and Dennis McNicholas would co-write. On May 29, 2015, the full voice cast was revealed, including James Marsden, Thomas Middleditch, Rosario Dawson, Alfred Molina, Nathan Fillion, Jane Krakowski, Rob Riggle, Craig Robinson and Will Sasso. At that time, it was also confirmed that production on the film had begun at Bron Studios in Burnaby and Duncan, British Columbia, and that Gary Sanchez Productions had left the project, replaced by Aaron L. Gilbert and Luke Carroll.

Critical reception

References

External links
 
 
 

2018 action comedy films
2010s animated superhero films
Animated action films
Animated superhero comedy films
Bron Studios films
Canadian action comedy films
Canadian animated feature films
Canadian superhero films
Features based on short films
Films scored by Toby Chu
Films shot in British Columbia
2010s English-language films
2010s Canadian films
Supervillain films